Chicago Sons is an American sitcom television series created by Ed Decter and John J. Strauss, that aired on NBC from January 8 until July 2, 1997.

Premise
Three brothers move into an apartment overlooking Wrigley Field.

Cast
Jason Bateman as Harry Kulchak
D.W. Moffett as Mike Kulchak
David Krumholtz as Billy Kulchak
Paula Marshall as Lindsay Sutton

Episodes

References

External links

1997 American television series debuts
1997 American television series endings
1990s American sitcoms
English-language television shows
NBC original programming
Television shows set in Chicago
Television series by Warner Bros. Television Studios
Television series about brothers